Bigfoot Discovery Museum is a museum in Felton, California devoted to Bigfoot (Sasquatch).
The founder, Michael Rugg, graduated from Stanford University in 1968, worked in Silicon Valley until the dot-com bust, then opened the museum in 2004 or 2005. Paula Yarr is listed as a co-founder. The museum features tchotchkes from the 1970s Bigfoot boom, and the 1980s resurrection with Harry and the Hendersons memorabilia.

References

Sources

 

2005 establishments in California
Bigfoot museums
Museums established in 2005
Museums in Santa Cruz County, California